The Matterhorn Gotthard Bahn is a narrow gauge railway line and a railway company (Matterhorn Gotthard Bahn AG, MGB) in Switzerland. It was created in 2003 through an amalgamation of Furka Oberalp Bahn (FO) and BVZ Zermatt-Bahn (BVZ). The name comes from the Matterhorn and St. Gotthard Pass.

From Andermatt, a branch line (the formerly independent Schöllenenbahn) extends to Göschenen, at the northern end of the Gotthard Rail Tunnel.

The network is an adhesion railway but using Abt rack assistance on the steeper inclines.

The old line, the scenic route, which is very attractive to tourists, is operated by the Dampfbahn Furka-Bergstrecke (DFB) ("Furka Heritage Railway") using veteran steam engines.

There is a connection to the Rhaetian Railway in Disentis and the Glacier Express runs from Zermatt to St. Moritz, using stock from both companies.

Operation

Apart from the Glacier Express, the current schedule sees passenger trains commuting between Brig and Zermatt, Brig and Göschenen, as well as Andermatt and Disentis. MGB also operates two car shuttle trains: between Realp and Oberwald through Furka Base Tunnel, and between Andermatt and Sedrun.

Large-scale freight traffic only takes place between Visp and Zermatt and between Disentis and the NRLA construction site near Sedrun.

Accidents and incidents
11 September 2017, the locomotive of a train collided with its own coaches during a manoeuvre at  station. About 30 people were injured.
3 July 2020, a shuttle train hit the side of the passenger train, which was carrying 30 passengers. A few minor injuries were reported. The wreck occurred in the small town of Oberwald in south Switzerland, near the Italian border. The Matterhorn Gotthard Bahn train line, which passes through the Alps, was halted on account of the crash.

Corporate structure
The MGB is composed of three companies: the Matterhorn Gotthard AG (MGB) emerged from a rebranding of BVZ, the Matterhorn Gotthard infrastructure AG (MGI) is the former FO, and a new stock company Matterhorn Gotthard railway (MGM) has been established as a management umbrella. The MGB has taken over FO's operations and has turned over BVZ's infrastructure to MGI in exchange. The MGB is majority owned by the BVZ Holding AG (which also owns the Gornergratbahn AG (GGB)), whereas the MGI shares are held by the Swiss federal government and the cantons, MGM is owned by BVZ Holding and the public sector in equal shares.

Pictures

See also
 List of narrow-gauge railways in Switzerland
 List of railway companies in Switzerland
 Table of turn tunnels

References

External links

 
 Glacier Express web site

 
MGB
Metre gauge railways in Switzerland